= AAA Insurance 200 =

AAA Insurance 200 may refer to:

- The AAA Insurance 200 (Dover), a NASCAR Camping World Truck Series race held at Dover International Speedway between 2006 and 2009
- The AAA Insurance 200 (LOR), a NASCAR Camping World Truck Series race held at Indianapolis Raceway Park between 2009 and 2011
